Songwe Bridge is an international bridge across the Songwe River linking Malawi and Tanzania.

See also 
Malawi-Tanzania border

References

Malawi–Tanzania bridges
Bridges in Tanzania
Bridges in Malawi